Magonia is a cloud realm in a French medieval folk tale. It may also refer to:

 Magonia (plant), a genus of plants
 Magonia, a novel by Maria Dahvana Headley
 "Magonia", a song on the 2007 release of the Comsat Angels' album My Mind's Eye

See also 
 Mahonia, another genus of plants